Eli Zeira (born  1928) is a former major general in the Israel Defense Forces. He was director of Aman, Israel's military intelligence, during the 1973 Yom Kippur War. He is most remembered for his ill-conceived prewar assessment that Egypt and Syria would not attack (also known as "The Concept"),  despite intelligence to the contrary.

The postwar Agranat Commission, set to investigate the reasons for the costly war, found Zeira to be negligent of his duty, and he resigned.

In 2004, former Mossad Director-General Zvi Zamir accused Zeira of leaking the identity of Ashraf Marwan, an Egyptian billionaire who served as a Mossad informant. The State Prosecutor's Office opened a criminal investigation, which proved inconclusive and was closed in 2012.

References

1928 births
Living people
Directors of the Military Intelligence Directorate (Israel)
Israeli generals
People from Haifa